The ash-winged antwren (Euchrepomis spodioptila) is an insectivorous bird in the antbird family Thamnophilidae. It is found in Brazil, Colombia, Ecuador, French Guiana, Guyana, Peru, Suriname, and Venezuela. Its natural habitat is subtropical or tropical moist lowland forests.

The ash-winged antwren was described and illustrated by the English ornithologists Philip Sclater and Osbert Salvin in 1881 and given the binomial name Terenura spodioptila. The current genus Euchrepomis was introduced in 2012.

There are three subspecies:
 Euchrepomis spodioptila signata (Zimmer, JT, 1932) – southeast Colombia, east Ecuador, northeast Peru and northwest Brazil
 Euchrepomis spodioptila spodioptila (Sclater, PL & Salvin, 1881) – south Venezuela, the Guianas and north central Brazil
 Euchrepomis spodioptila meridionalis (Snethlage, E, 1925) – south central Amazonian Brazil

References

External links
Image at ADW 

ash-winged antwren
Birds of the Amazon Basin
Birds of the Colombian Amazon
Birds of the Venezuelan Amazon
Birds of the Guianas
ash-winged antwren
ash-winged antwren
ash-winged antwren
Taxonomy articles created by Polbot